Janna Lynette Mizens née Ellsworth (born November 18, 1974) is an American Paralympic wheelchair basketball player. She has won a gold medal at the 2004 Summer Paralympics.

Career
Crawford attended the University of Illinois at Urbana-Champaign where she competed on their women's wheelchair basketball team and was named to the second team All-Tournament. She wrote her masters thesis on "Constraints of elite athletes with disabilities in Kenya," which she later published with Monika Stodolska in the Journal of Leisure Research.

She competed with Team USA at the 2000 Summer Paralympics. At the 2004 Summer Paralympics, she recorded nine points and 10 rebounds to help Team USA win gold over Australia.

References

Living people
Illinois Fighting Illini women's basketball players
American women's wheelchair basketball players
Paralympic wheelchair basketball players of the United States
Paralympic gold medalists for the United States
Medalists at the 2004 Summer Paralympics
People from Auburn, Washington
Paralympic medalists in wheelchair basketball
Wheelchair basketball players at the 2004 Summer Paralympics
1974 births
20th-century American women
21st-century American women